CALLING is FLOW's nineteenth single. Its A-Side was used as the first ending theme song for Heroman. The single has two editions: regular and limited. The limited edition includes a bonus DVD with extra clips including its music video. It reached #21 on the Oricon charts and charted for 3 weeks. *

Track listing

Bonus DVD Track listing

References

Flow (band) songs
2010 songs
Ki/oon Music singles